Thailand competed at the 2020 Summer Paralympics from 24 August to 5 September 2021. This was the country's tenth appearance at the Paralympic Games.

Medalists

Competitors

Archery

Thailand have secured three quotas in men's archery following success in the 2019 World Para Archery Championship in 's-Hertogenbosch, the Netherlands. Two quotas in men's events won by two compound archers, Anon Aungaphinan (sixth place in the secondary tournament) and Singpirom Comsan (seventh place in the secondary tournament). Another quota won by Rio games silver medal recurve archer, Hanreuchai Netsiri (champion in the secondary tournament).

Thailand have secured another quota in women's archery following success in the 2019 Asia Continental Qualification Tournament in Bangkok, Thailand. A quota in women's events won by a recurve archer, Pattawaeo Phattharaphon.

Under Paralympic qualification rules, an NPC that has qualified an archer both men's and women's events in the same category will enter a mixed team (1 male, 1 female) into the relevant team event.

Compound open

Recurve open

Athletics

Four male wheelchair racers and two female runners secure nine quotas following success in the 2019 World Para Athletics Championships in Dubai, the United Arab Emirates. At this event, the top four ranked athletes in each individual events will obtain one qualification slot for their respective National Paralympic Committee, in the case that an athlete is ranked first to fourth in more than one medal event, the athlete can only obtain one qualification slot for their National Paralympic Committee.

On November 8, Pongsakorn Paeyo qualified by winning a bronze medal in men's 100 metres T53 Then, He qualified by winning in men's 400 metres T53 on November 9. Chaiwat Rattana qualified by winning the fourth place in men's 100 metres T34, on November 10. Suneeporn Tanomwong and her guide Patchai Srikhamphan won a bronze medal and qualified women's 400 metres T11 in the same day. On November 11, Prawat Wahoram and Rawat Tana are athletes qualified in men's 1500 metres T54 after winning a gold medal and fourth place respectively. Another quota Pongsakorn qualified is men's 800 metres T53 after he won a silver medal on November 12. On November 13, Prawat won a gold medal again and qualified men's 5000 metres T54. The last quota of this events won by Orawan Kaising after winning the fourth place in women's 400 metres T20 on November 15.

Track events
Men

Women

Field events
Men

Women

Badminton 

Men

Women

Mixed

Boccia

Eight National Paralympic Committee quotas and three individual athlete quotas were secured. Any athlete qualified via a National Paralympic Committee quota must participate in pairs and team events. The National Paralympic Committee that qualified in pairs and team events can enter one athlete in each individual event.

Four quotas were secured following success in the 2019 BISFed Boccia Asia/Oceania Championships in Seoul, South Korea. At this event, the winners in each regional championship excluding the host country, Japan in pairs and team events will obtain one qualification slot for their respective National Paralympic Committee not to individual athlete. On July 7, Worawut Saengampa won a gold medal in the event of mixed individual BC1 and made the first quota of Thai boccia. A quota of mixed team BC1–2 is secured after Thailand won South Korea by 12–1 in the final match with a team made up of Witsanu Huadpradit, Natthawut Deemak, Subin Tipmanee, Worawut Saengampa, and Watcharaphon Vongsa on July 9.

The BISFed world ranking for the paralympic qualifiers was released on December 31, 2019. For pairs and team events, the six highest ranked, not otherwise qualified, will obtain one qualification slot for their respective National Paralympic Committee. For individual events, the four highest ranked and the highest female athletes whose National Paralympic Committee are not qualified for pairs and team events will obtain one qualification slot via an individual quota. Thailand secured seven quotas from two pairs and five individual events. Three of five are individual athlete quotas by Witsanu Huadpradit in BC1, Worawut Saengampa in BC2, and Pornchok Larpyen in BC4.
 
Individual

Pairs

Team

Cycling

Thailand have nominated one cyclists to take part in the cycling events at the 2020 Paralympic Games.

Football 5-a-side

Thailand qualified to compete in football 5-a-side at the 2020 Summer Paralympics for the first time after Iran withdrew.

Judo

Powerlifting

Shooting

Two Thai shooters competed after qualifying in Men's 10m Air Rifle Standing SH1 & Women's 10m Air Rifle Standing SH1 events. The shooters are Wiraphon Mansing & Wannipa Leungvilai.

Swimming

Two Thai swimmer has successfully entered the paralympic slot after breaking the MQS.

Men

Women

Table tennis

Eight quotas including five in men's and three in women's were secured following success in the 2019 ITTF Asian Para Championships in Taichung, Chinese Taipei and ITTF World Ranking Allocation released on 30 June 2020.

Men's singles

Women's singles

Men's team

Women's team

Taekwondo

Para taekwondo makes its debut appearance in the Paralympic programme, Khwansuda Phuangkitcha qualified to the 2020 Summer Paralympics via World Ranking.

Wheelchair tennis

Thailand qualified three players entries for wheelchair tennis. Two of them qualified by world ranking, while the other qualified by received the bipartite commission invitation allocation quotas.

Wheelchair fencing

Thailand qualified one player entry for wheelchair fencing. 
Women's individual

See also
Thailand at the Paralympics
Thailand at the 2020 Summer Olympics

References

Nations at the 2020 Summer Paralympics
2020
2021 in Thai sport